Isidro Ibarrondo (born 21 December 1970) is an Argentine gymnast. He competed in seven events at the 1992 Summer Olympics.

References

1970 births
Living people
Argentine male artistic gymnasts
Olympic gymnasts of Argentina
Gymnasts at the 1992 Summer Olympics
Place of birth missing (living people)
Pan American Games medalists in gymnastics
Pan American Games bronze medalists for Argentina
Gymnasts at the 1995 Pan American Games
Medalists at the 1995 Pan American Games
Competitors at the 1994 South American Games
South American Games gold medalists for Argentina
South American Games silver medalists for Argentina
South American Games medalists in gymnastics
20th-century Argentine people